McNall is a surname. Notable people with the surname include:

Bruce McNall (born 1950), American racehorse owner and sports executive
Thomas McNall (1874–1953), Canadian merchant and politician

See also
McCall
McNally (surname)